Clarksville is an unincorporated community in Kootenai County, Idaho, United States.

History
Clarksville's population was 44 persons in 1960.

References

Unincorporated communities in Kootenai County, Idaho
Unincorporated communities in Idaho